Leucostrophus is a genus of moths in the family Sphingidae.

Species
Leucostrophus alterhirundo d'Abrera, 1987
Leucostrophus commasiae (Walker, 1856)

Macroglossini
Moth genera
Taxa named by Walter Rothschild
Taxa named by Karl Jordan